Kabul Library is one of Afghanistan's oldest and largest libraries, located in the capital Kabul. It includes books in many languages and topics including a vast majority in Persian/Dari, Pashto, Urdu, Russian, and Arabic. The library was built by King Amanullah Khan. It still exists today and is open to public. Most of the books are imported from Iran and they are in the Persian language. The library is said to have 220,000 books, of which 180,000 are in Persian/Dari. This library is seen as a symbol of the progress towards gender equality and access to education in Afghanistan.

References

Government of Afghanistan
Buildings and structures in Kabul
Libraries in Afghanistan
Afghanistan–Soviet Union relations